Echo Peak, elevation , is a mountain peak in the southern section of the Gallatin Range in Yellowstone National Park, in the U.S. state of Montana.

Echo Peak is so named because of its remarkable echo.

See also
 Mountains and mountain ranges of Yellowstone National Park

Notes

Mountains of Wyoming
Mountains of Yellowstone National Park
Mountains of Park County, Wyoming